Emily Burling Waite (1887–1980) was an American printmaker and painter.

Early life and education
Born in Worcester, Massachusetts, she studied first at the Worcester Art Museum School, then the Art Students League, New York. Following this, she studied for two years at the Boston Museum of Fine Arts School.

Collections
Her work is included in the collections of the Smithsonian American Art Museum and the Metropolitan Museum of Art.

References

1887 births
1980 deaths
20th-century American women artists
Artists from Worcester, Massachusetts